Rolf Birger "Pesen" Pedersen (23 September 1939 - 22 March 2001) was a Norwegian footballer and football coach. He grew up near Brann Stadion, and later became one of Brann's most legendary players. He was also capped 15 times for the Norway national football team, scoring 5 goals.

Pesen was a creative and goalscoring midfielder, and is considered by many to be Brann's best player in their championship-seasons 1962 and 1963. Pedersen was particularly known for his remarkably hard shots. It is told that he once shot a goalkeeper into the goal, and he shot a keeper so hard that he fainted. He never reached the same level in the following seasons, possibly losing his motivation after being so successful in his younger years. Nevertheless, his track record in Brann is impressive, with 335 matches and a record high 245 goals in the red jersey.

After his retirement in 1972, Pesen continued his football life as head coach in many of the Bergen-based clubs in the lower divisions. Later he held many different positions in his old club Brann, culminating in his run as chairman of the club. In the late 1990s he was made responsible for Brann Stadion.

In 2000 Pesen was diagnosed with cancer, and for a while it looked like he would pull through, but he had a fallback, and died on 22 March 2001 at the age of 61.

Career statistics

Honours
Norwegian top division: 1961–62, 1963

Individual
Norwegian top division top scorer: 1961–62

References

External links

External links 
 

1939 births
2001 deaths
Norwegian footballers
Norway international footballers
SK Brann players
Eliteserien players
Association football forwards
Footballers from Bergen